Azanidazole is a nitroimidazole derivative used in gynecology for the treatment of trichomonal infections.

References

Nitroimidazole antibiotics
Antiprotozoal agents
Pyrimidines
Alkene derivatives